Lyulin is a range of hills in western Bulgaria, located several kilometres west of Sofia. The highest point is Dupevitsa Peak (1,256 m). The Buchino Pass divides the hills into two, a western and an eastern part. Bonsovi Polyani are a popular tourist attraction.

On the slopes of Liulin are some of the most beautiful quarters of Sofia - Knyazhevo, Gorna Banya and Bankya, known with their mineral springs.

Honour
Lyulin Peak on Livingston Island in the South Shetland Islands, Antarctica is named after Lyulin Mountain.

Mountains of Bulgaria
Landforms of Sofia City Province
Rhodope mountain range